Basil Robert Ward (22 July 1902 – 1976) was an architect born in Hawke's Bay, New Zealand who, with his partners Amyas Connell and Colin Lucas, pioneered modernist architecture in England.

Life 
Basil Ward was articled to James Hay in Napier, New Zealand from 1918 to 1923. In 1924, with Amyas Connell, he worked his passage to England to further his architectural studies. In 1926–27 he was on a scholarship in Rome. In 1928 he married Beatrix Connell (Amyas Connell's sister; Connell married Maud Hargreaves, Ward's sister) and from then until 1930 worked in Rangoon in the Foster & Ward partnership. At the end of 1930 he returned to England and joined the Connell partnership just as High and Over was nearing completion.

After dissolution of the Connell, Ward and Lucas partnership in 1939 following the outbreak of war, Ward served in the British Royal Navy, then became a partner in Ramsey, Murray, White and Ward. From 1953 to 1956 he was Lethaby professor of architecture at the Royal College of Art in London, later becoming head of the school of architecture at Manchester College of Art and Design (which subsequently amalgamated with the College of Commerce and John Dalton College of Technology to become Manchester Polytechnic) and lecturing at Lancaster University.

Connell, Ward and Lucas 
Connell and Ward formed the Connell, Ward and Lucas architectural practice in London with the English architect Colin Lucas in May 1934. The partners worked separately and carried out a small but highly significant body of work including modernist private houses (notably 66 Frognal), flats and a film studio. Ward's particular contributions were The Concrete House, Westbury-on-Trym (with Connell 1934–35) and Usherwood, Sutton Abinger, Surrey (1934–35).

Sources

External links 

 Dennis Sharp archive at the Paul Mellon Centre; research papers on the works of Connell, Ward & Lucas

1902 births
1976 deaths
New Zealand expatriates in the United Kingdom
Modernist architects
20th-century New Zealand architects